The Awful Tooth is a 1938 Our Gang short comedy film directed by Nate Watt.  It was the 167th Our Gang short (168th episode, 79th talking short, and the 80th talking episode) that was released.

Plot
Alfalfa, Buckwheat, Porky, and Spike in need of money to purchase baseball equipment, devise a scheme: they will have all their teeth pulled out, which they calculate will earn them one dime per tooth from the tooth fairy. Their dentist hears of their plan, and takes steps to dissuade the kids—beginning with a terrified Alfalfa. In the end, Alfalfa decides to keep his teeth, but the dentist does give them some baseball equipment as a reward for 
learning a valuable lesson about dental health.

Cast

The Gang
 Eugene Lee as Porky
 Carl Switzer as Alfalfa
 Billie Thomas as Buckwheat
 Henry Lee as Spike
 George the Monkey as himself
 Pete the Pup as himself

Additional cast
 Jack Norton as Dr. Schwartz
 Marjorie Townsend as Miss Rogers

See also
Our Gang filmography

References

External links

1938 films
American black-and-white films
Hal Roach Studios short films
1938 comedy films
Films directed by Nate Watt
Our Gang films
1930s American films
1930s English-language films